Pahok is the name of several villages in Burma:

 Pahok, Bhamo
 Pahok, Homalin